The 2002–03 season was the 107th year in non-League football and sixth season since their return to the Football Conference played by Yeovil Town Football Club, an English football club based in Yeovil, Somerset.

Yeovil began the season playing their home matches at The Avenue Stadium, home of Dorchester Town, while the Huish Park pitch was being relaid. Yeovil occupied top spot in the Conference from late September until the end of the season, eventually winning the title by a records points margin and earning promotion to the Football League for the first time in the club's 108-year history.

The team reached the first round of the FA Cup but lost 2–0 at home to Second Division side Cheltenham Town. The team failed to defend their FA Trophy title being knocked out in the quarter-final after being beaten 2–0 by Northern Premier League side Burscough. Kirk Jackson was the club's top goalscorer after joining in November scored 20 goals, with 19 in the league and one in the FA Trophy.

Background

The 2001–02 season was manager Gary Johnson's first season in charge having succeed Colin Addison in June 2001,  and the team finished third in the Football Conference. Yeovil finished the season with major silverware after victory in the 2002 FA Trophy Final, staged at Villa Park. Francis Kumbur and first year professional Richard Parkisnon were released by Yeovil after the FA Trophy final while Andy Turner had his contract terminated by mutual consent. Steve Collis, Olivier Brassart, Chris Giles, Andy Lindegaard, Roy O'Brien and Faisal Mali all signed new contracts with the club.

Yeovil made two signings over the close season midfielder Gavin Williams signed from Hereford United for a fee of £22,500, and Mali striker Abdoulaye Demba formerly of Oostende joined on a free transfer. While defender Stephen Reed entered the first team squad from the youth team after agreeing a professional contract.

Review

Pre-season
The squad returned for pre-season training on 1 July. The first day of pre-season saw the arrival of two new signings, Welsh attacking midfielder Gavin Williams and Mali forward Abdoulaye Demba. Yeovil started pre-season with a tour of Lavia, and on 5 July played Latvian Higher League champions Skonto with goal from Adam Stansfield and Adam Lockwood earning Yeovil a 2–2 draw. Yeovil's second match of their tour saw them beat FK Auda 1–0 courtesy of goal from Carl Alford, on 7 July. On 11 July, Yeovil concluded their pre-season tour with a 2–1 defeat FK Ventspils. Yeovil returned to England with seven friendly victories against non-league sides, and 1–0 victories over Second Division side Bristol City and Third Division side Exeter City. Yeovil's pre-season preparation featured thirteen matches in all with ten victories, two draws and one defeat with Yeovil scoring 29 goals and conceding 8. Before Yeovil's first match of the season French midfielder Olivier Brassart left the club to join Scarborough, while goalkeeper Steve Collis departed on loan to Tiverton Town.

August

Yeovil began their Conference season playing their home matches at The Avenue Stadium, home of Dorchester Town, due to the relaying of the Huish Park pitch. Yeovil's opening match saw them draw 2–2 against Gravesend & Northfleet, coming from two goals behind at half time with an injury time equaliser from Terry Skiverton. The game saw striker Adam Stansfield substituted through injury after only 16 minutes that was later confirmed to be a break of the tibia and fibula an injury that ruled him out for the remainder of the season. On 20 August, Yeovil's poor start to the season continued as they suffered a 2–1 defeat away against Barnet. On 22 August, Yeovil confirmed the signing of former striker Howard Forinton after his release from Torquay United, while young striker Chris Giles left on a one-month loan to Weymouth. Yeovil ended the month with three consecutive victories, with a 2–1 win against Morecambe, a 3–2 victory over Nuneaton Borough, and a 1–0 win away at Kettering Town.

September
Yeovil started September by extending their winning run to five consecutive matches, with further victories 2–0 against Farnborough, and 2–1 versus Northwich Victoria. Two away draws followed against Stevenage Borough and Hereford United. On 20 September, Yeovil beat Halifax Town 3–0 despite having two men sent off after a mass brawl saw Abdoulaye Demba and Terry Skiverton both dismissed for violent conduct. On 22 September, Stockport County signed defender Anthony Tonkin for £50,000, a transfer that saw manager Gary Johnson hit out at the power of agents alleging that Tonkin's representative advised the player to refuse to play against Halifax. Yeovil marked their return to their newly relaid Huish Park pitch with an emphatic 4–0 victory over Woking. On 28 September, a 4–2 victory away at Leigh RMI saw Yeovil hit the top of the Conference table. The end of the month saw the club bring in French-born Moroccan left sided player Abdou El-Kholti as a replacement for the departed Tonkin.

October
Yeovil began October, with a 6–0 victory over Southport with Malian striker Abdoulaye Demba scoring a first-half hat-trick. A 1–1 draw away at Burton Albion, was followed with a 5–0 away victory over Telford United. Despite dominating their next home match against Doncaster Rovers, on 19 October,  a "superb effort from 25 yards" from Gavin Williams was only enough for a 1–1 draw. On 23 October, the club faced Boston United in the first round of the Football League Trophy, after two injury time goals saw them lose 4–2  against the Third Division side. Yeovil traveled to Twerton Park to face local rivals Bath City, on 27 October, in the fourth qualifying round of the FA Cup but Yeovil were held to a 1–1 draw against their lower league rivals. The replay was played two days later, and two goals from Demba helped earn Yeovil a 3–1 victory and progress to the first round proper of the FA Cup. Yeovil's eight points from their four league matches saw manager Gary Johnson named Conference manager of the month for October.

November
Yeovil started November with consecutive 2–2 draws away at Chester City, and at home against Dagenham & Redbridge. On 16 November, Yeovil were knocked out of the first round of the FA Cup by Second Division side Cheltenham Town, after losing 2–0. Yeovil progressed to the third round of the Somerset Premier Cup, on 19 November, with a 2–1 extra time victory over Mangotsfield United, with both goals from Abdoulaye Demba. A goal from Michael McIndoe was enough to earn a 1–0 victory over Southport. Before Yeovil's final match of November, the club released Howard Forinton after 4 goals in 17 matches. While the club signed former Torquay United defender Jimmy Aggrey on a month's contract, and paid Stevenage Borough £20,000 for the services of striker Kirk Jackson, who had scored twice against Yeovil earlier in the season. Jackson made his debut in Yeovil's 2–1 victory over Margate, on 30 November, as they maintained their three-point lead at the top of the Conference.

December
Yeovil began December by suffering only their second defeat of the season, losing 2–1 away at Scarborough. On 11 December, forward Chris Giles joined fellow Conference side Gravesend & Northfleet on a three-month loan deal. Yeovil got back to winning ways with Kirk Jackson scoring his first goal for the club helped earn the club a 2–1 victory away at Northwich Victoria, and the followed it up with another Jackson goal against his former club helping Yeovil to a 2–1 win over Stevenage Borough. On Boxing Day, Yeovil traveled to struggling Forest Green Rovers and lost 2–1 as the Glovers suffered their third defeat of the season. Two days later, on 28 December, Yeovil were held to a goalless draw by Barnet. Before the match the club confirmed that striker Carl Alford has been released by the club.

January
New Year's Day, saw Yeovil get revenge for their Boxing Day defeat with a 1–0 home victory against Forest Green Rovers. On 4 January, Yeovil travelled to Northfleet, and a fourth goal in six matches from Kirk Jackson and a hat-trick from Andy Lindegaard saw Yeovil record a 4–2 victory over Gravesend & Northfleet. Abdoulaye Demba left the club for on a free transfer after struggling to settle at Yeovil, he left the club having scored 8 goals in 21 matches. Yeovil began their defence of the FA Trophy with a trip to Hereford United. Goals from defender Colin Pluck and Adam Lockwood saw Yeovil win 2–1 and qualify for the fourth round. Yeovil extended their lead at the top of the table to eight points with a 2–0 victory over Morecambe, but ended January by dropping two points away at relegation threatened Nuneaton Borough in a 1–1 draw.

February

Yeovil faced Morecambe at home in the FA Trophy fourth round and came out 2–1 victors after goals from Kirk Jackson and Terry Skiverton. Early February saw defender Tom White join Woking on a one-month loan deal, while the club signed former Bristol Rovers forward Kevin Gall and completed the loan signing of Jason Blunt from Scarborough with a view to a permanent move. New striker Kevin Gall scored on his debut as a substitute in a 4–0 home victory against Kettering Town, on 8 February. Blunt's loan spell at Yeovil was cut short after just one match after he was recalled by Scarborough after he was signed by Doncaster Rovers. After losing out with Blunt, manager Gary Johnson signed midfielder Neil Mustoe from Stevenage Borough on a free transfer until the end of the season. Yeovil extended their unbeaten league run to nine games with a 4–2 victory over Farnborough, on 9 February. Yeovil ended February with two cup victories, 2–0 over Odd Down in the Somerset Premier Cup, and a 2–1 victory against Northwich Victoria as Yeovil continued their defence of the FA Trophy.

March
Yeovil began March, with a 4–0 thrashing of rivals Hereford United, and then a second half hat-trick from Kevin Gall saw Yeovil come from two goals down to beat Halifax Town 3–2. On 8 March, top scorer Kirk Jackson grabbed his 18th goal of the season, including seven for Stevenage, to earn 10-man Yeovil a 1–1 draw at Woking. Yeovil got back to winning ways and opened up a 12-point lead at the top of the Conference with a 3–1 victory against Leigh RMI, with Jackson grabbing a brace. Yeovil's hopes of a Conference and FA Trophy double, were ended on 15 March, after a 2–0 home defeat against Burscough in the sixth round ended their defence of the title. Yeovil bounced back from their FA Trophy defeat with a 2–1 victory over Margate with another brace from Kirk Jackson. On 28 March, Yeovil ended the month with a 1–0 home victory over Scarborough. After recording four wins and a draw from their five league matches in March, Johnson picked up his second manager of the month award of the season.

April

On 5 April, a 3–0 home win against Telford United took Yeovil to within one point of winning the Conference title.  Before they could wrap it up they faced Clevedon Town in the semi-finals of the Somerset Premier Cup and a strong Yeovil side was to good for their lower league rivals winning 4–0. Yeovil's promotion was confirmed before kick-off against Doncaster Rovers, on 12 April, after Chester City's 2–2 draw with Woking. The Glovers celebrated their title, and promotion to the Football League for the first time in their 108-year history, with an emphatic 4–0 rout of Doncaster at Belle Vue. Yeovil continued their form with a 6–1 win over Burton Albion, on 19 April, with Kevin Gall scoring four. Yeovil's penultimate match of the season saw them travel to face play-off qualifiers Dagenham & Redbridge, a sixth goal in three matches from Kevin Gall and a Kirk Jackson hat-trick saw Yeovil record an impressive 4–0 away win, and their seventh successive win in the Conference a club record at that level. The match also saw the league debut of youth team player Stephen Reed. Yeovil completed their record breaking season against Chester City in front of 8,111 fans, the highest crowd in the Conference that season, and opened the scoring through Kevin Gall with their 100th goal in the Conference but a late equaliser forced them to settle for a 1–1 draw. After recording a further four wins and a draw from their five league matches in April, Johnson was awarded his third manager of the month award of the season, shared with Jim Harvey of Morecambe. Yeovil then faced Taunton Town, on 29 April 2003, in the final of the Somerset Premier Cup played at the home of Clevedon Town, but failed to add the cup to their Conference title losing 2–1.

Summary and aftermath
After a sluggish start to the season, Yeovil occupied top spot in the Conference from late September until the end of the season, before eventually winning the title by a record 17-point margin and earning promotion to the Football League for the first time in the club's 108-year history. In the league the team were unbeaten at home winning 16 matches and drawing 5, compared to winning 12, drawing 6 and losing 3 away from home. The three defeats Yeovil suffered was the joint fewest of any team since the formation of the Conference. The club scored 100 league goals the most in the Conference and had a record goal difference of +63. The club also recorded the highest average attendance ever in the Conference of 4,741, despite starting the season playing at Dorchester. Michael McIndoe recorded the highest number of appearances during the season, appearing in 49 of Yeovil's 51 matches, excluding the Somerset Premier Cup. After joining in November, Kirk Jackson was the club's top goalscorer with 19 goals in the Conference and 20 goals for the club in all competitions, and finished as runner-up in the Conference golden boot.

The end of the season saw manager Gary Johnson release four players, including Jimmy Aggrey, Kim Grant, Neil Mustoe, Jon Sheffield, while defender Tom White was invited back to pre-season training to prove his fitness. Seven players all signed new contracts at the end of the season including striker Kevin Gall, midfielder Abdou El-Kholti, defenders Roy O'Brien and Stephen Reed as well as forwards Adam Stansfield, Andy Lindegaard and Chris Giles. While Yeovil dominated the end of season Conference awards, Johnson walked away with manager of the year, winger Michael McIndoe winning the player of the year award and he was joined in the team of the year by goalkeeper Chris Weale, captain Terry Skiverton and Darren Way.

Club

Coaching staff

Kit

|
|

Transfers

In

Out

Loan in

Loan out

Match results

Conference

League table

FA Cup

FA Trophy

Football League Trophy

Somerset Premier Cup

Squad statistics
Source:

Numbers in parentheses denote appearances as substitute.
Players with squad numbers struck through and marked  left the club during the playing season.
Players with names in italics and marked * were on loan from another club for the whole of their season with Yeovil.
Players listed with no appearances have been in the matchday squad but only as unused substitutes.
Key to positions: GK – Goalkeeper; DF – Defender; MF – Midfielder; FW – Forward

Footnotes
A.  Until the 24 September 2012, Yeovil played all of their home matches at Dorchester Town's The Avenue Stadium due to the relaying of the Huish Park pitch.
B.  After extra time.
C.  Final played at The Hand Stadium home of Clevedon Town.

See also
 2002–03 in English football
 List of Yeovil Town F.C. seasons

References

English football clubs 2002–03 season
2002-03